Rhamphomyia sulcata is a species of dance flies, in the fly family Empididae. It is included in the subgenus Rhamphomyia. It is found in most of Europe, except the Balkan Peninsula.

References

External links
Fauna Europaea
Ecology of Commanster

Rhamphomyia
Asilomorph flies of Europe
Insects described in 1804